Rajamangala University of Technology Nan Campus Stadium is a multi-purpose stadium in Nan Province , Thailand.  It is currently used mostly for football matches and is the home stadium of Nan F.C.  The stadium holds 2,000 people.

Multi-purpose stadiums in Thailand
Buildings and structures in Nan province
Sport in Nan province